Tomasz Krzeszewski (born 19 September 1974) is a Polish table tennis player. He competed at the 2000 Summer Olympics and the 2004 Summer Olympics.

References

1974 births
Living people
Polish male table tennis players
Olympic table tennis players of Poland
Table tennis players at the 2000 Summer Olympics
Table tennis players at the 2004 Summer Olympics
People from Zgierz
People from Ostróda